Uryu Doentei Earth-fill Dam  is an earthfill dam located in Hokkaido Prefecture in Japan. The dam is used for power production. The catchment area of the dam is 368.5 km2. The dam impounds about 2373  ha of land when full and can store 244653 thousand cubic meters of water. The construction of the dam was started on 1939 and completed in 1943.

References

Dams in Hokkaido